Clyde Wilfred Cook (16 December 1891 – 13 August 1984) was an Australian-born vaudevillian who went on to perform in Hollywood and whose career spanned the silent film era, talkies and television.

Career in Australia

He was born to John and Annie Cook at Hamilton, near Port Macquarie, Australia. Cook moved with his family to Sydney when he was 6. He was already a skilled acrobat and dancer before he first appeared on stage in 1901 and within a few years he had developed a successful reputation as an all-around comic entertainer. In 1906, J. C. Williamson placed Cook under contract and he worked with the company until about 1911, when he departed for the United Kingdom, determined to try his luck in the London music hall scene. After some difficulty he succeeded and subsequently also worked at the Folies Bergere for 14 weeks. He returned to Australia in 1916.

Although he appears to have expressed a desire to join up during the First World War, unspecified "physical defects" (perhaps owing to his slight frame) meant he was unable to join the First Australian Imperial Force. Instead he devoted much time to fund-raising and entertaining soldiers. His trademark moustache also appeared for the first time during Australian performances in 1917. In 1918 he appeared in his first film, His Only Chance a J. C. Williamson production made to support Red Cross fund-raising. Then in 1919, in the height of the Spanish flu epidemic, Cook brought an action against J. C. Williamson over the impact on performers contacts caused by their closure of theatres. The action failed. Soon after Cook left Australia for the United States.

Move to the United States

Appearing at the New York Hippodrome from mid-1919 until early 1920, he was reportedly an immediate success - often styled as the "Inja Rubber Idiot" in his early U.S. performances. During this season he was seen by film producer William Fox, who signed him for a series of comedy shorts to be made in Hollywood. He arrived there in 1920, making a string of comedies.

Stardom
In 1925 he was signed by Hal Roach for a series of short comedies. Some of these were directed by Stan Laurel and featured ridiculous visual gags, which Cook enacted with flair. One such vignette, in Wandering Papas (1926), had Cook crossing a stream on foot, by raising his shoes to his knees and striding across the water. In addition to his acrobatics, Cook capitalized on his facial reactions, ranging from affability to determination to blank bemusement. These comedies made Clyde Cook a comedy star.

He was signed by Warner Bros. in 1927. He made a transition to supporting character roles in sound films, which revealed his Australian speaking voice. This soon typecast him in cockney roles, as in the Bulldog Drummond and Mr. Moto film series.

Personal life
Cook married actress Alice (née Draper) in 1925 and a child, Julia, was born of the union. However, the marriage was not a success and they divorced acrimoniously in 1938.
In 1948 Cook returned to Australia to make contact with his older brother Tom, with whom he had had no contact for twelve years.

Later career
Like many character players, Cook continued to play small parts into the 1950s, including television (as a London newspaper vendor in "A Ghost for Scotland Yard", a 1953 episode of The Adventures of Superman) and the Joe McDoakes movie comedies. His final film was the John Ford feature Donovan's Reef, made in 1963. 

Cook died on August 13, 1984, at his home in Carpinteria, California.

Partial filmography

 
His Only Chance (1918)
Soldiers of Fortune (1919) - (uncredited)
Skirts (1921) - Peter Rocks Jr.
He Who Gets Slapped (1924) - A Clown (uncredited)
So This Is Marriage? (1924) - Mr. Brown
Should Sailors Marry? (1925, Short) - Cyril D'Armond
What's the World Coming To? (1926, Short) - Claudia, the Blushing Groom / the baby
Wandering Papas (1926, Short) - Camp Cook
Wife Tamers (1926, Short) - The Butler
Miss Nobody (1926) - Bertie
The Winning of Barbara Worth (1926) - Tex
White Gold (1927) - Homer
The Brute (1927) - Oklahoma Red
The Climbers (1927) - Pancho Mendoza
Simple Sis (1927) - Jerry O'Grady
Barbed Wire (1927) - Hans
The Bush Leaguer (1927) - Skeeter McKinnon
A Sailor's Sweetheart (1927) - Sandy McTavish
Good Time Charley (1927) - Bill Collins
Beware of Married Men (1928) - Botts
Domestic Troubles (1928) - James Bullard / Horace Bullard
Pay as You Enter (1928) - Clyde Jones
Five and Ten Cent Annie (1928) - Elmer Peck
The Docks of New York (1928) - 'Sugar' Steve
Through the Breakers (1928) - John Lancaster
 Celebrity (1928) - Circus
Beware of Bachelors (1928) - Joe Babbitt
Interference (1928) - Hearse Driver
 The Spieler (1928) - Luke aka 'Perfesser' McIntosh
Captain Lash (1929) - Cocky
Strong Boy (1929) - Pete
A Dangerous Woman (1929) - Tubbs
Masquerade (1929) - Blkodgett
In the Headlines (1929) - Flashlight
The Taming of the Shrew (1929) - Grumio
Officer O'Brien (1930) - Limo Lewis
Women Everywhere (1930) - Sam Jones
The Dude Wrangler (1930) - Pinkey Fripp
The Dawn Patrol (1930) - Bott
 Wings of Adventure (1930) - Pete 'Skeets' Smith
Sunny (1930) - Sam
The March of Time (1930) - Himself
Daybreak (1931) - Josef
Never the Twain Shall Meet (1931) - Porter
The Secret Witness (1931) - Larson - Building Engineer
Blondie of the Follies (1932) - Dancer
West of Singapore (1933) - Ricky
Oliver Twist (1933) - Chitling
 Shock (1934) - Hawkins
The Informer (1935) - Flash Patron (uncredited)
Calm Yourself (1935) - Joe
The Bishop Misbehaves (1935) - Mission Patron Leading Search for Frenchy (uncredited)
Barbary Coast (1935) - Oakie
The White Angel (1936) - Perkins, a Soldier (uncredited)
Tugboat Princess (1936) - Steve, the engineer
Bulldog Drummond Escapes (1937) - Alf
Another Dawn (1937) - Sgt. Murphy
Wee Willie Winkie (1937) - Pipe Major Sneath
Souls at Sea (1937) - Hendry - Coachman (uncredited)
Love Under Fire (1937) - Bert
One Hundred Men and a Girl (1937) - Oscar - Man in Restaurant (uncredited)
Lancer Spy (1937) - Orderly (uncredited)
Bulldog Drummond's Peril (1938) - Constable Sacker
Kidnapped (1938) - Cook - Blubber
Mysterious Mr. Moto (1938) - Sandwich Man (uncredited)
The Storm (1938) - Tailor (uncredited)
Storm Over Bengal (1938) - Alf
Arrest Bulldog Drummond (1939) - Constable Sacker
The Little Princess (1939) - Attendant
Bulldog Drummond's Secret Police (1939) - Constable Hawkins
Bulldog Drummond's Bride (1939) - Traffic Control Constable (uncredited)
Pack Up Your Troubles (1939) - British Guard (uncredited)
The Light That Failed (1939) - Soldier (uncredited)
Wolf of New York (1940) - Jenkins (uncredited)
The Sea Hawk (1940) - Walter Boggs
Dance, Girl, Dance (1940) - Claude - Harris' Valet (uncredited)
Sergeant York (1941) - Cockney Soldier (uncredited)
Ladies in Retirement (1941) - Bates
Unexpected Uncle (1941) - Johnny's Band Singer (uncredited)
Suspicion (1941) - Photographer (uncredited)
Klondike Fury (1942) - Yukon
This Above All (1942) - Truck Driver (uncredited)
Counter-Espionage (1942) - Hot Chestnuts Huckster (uncredited)
White Cargo (1942) - Ted - First Mate of the Congo Queen
Forever and a Day (1943) - Cabby
The Mysterious Doctor (1943) - Herbert (uncredited)
The Man from Down Under (1943) - Ginger Gaffney
Follow the Boys (1944) - Stooge (uncredited)
The White Cliffs of Dover (1944) - Jennings (uncredited)
To Each His Own (1946) - Mr. Harkett
The Verdict (1946) - Barney Cole
Bulldog Drummond at Bay (1947) - Hotel Clerk (uncredited)
To the Victor (1948) - Cockney Bartender
Sword in the Desert (1949) - Sentry (uncredited)
When Willie Comes Marching Home (1950) - Tarjack (uncredited)
Pride of Maryland (1951) - Fred Leach
Rogue's March (1953) - Fisherman (uncredited)
Loose in London (1953) - English Cabbie
The Maze (1953) - Cab Driver (uncredited)
Abbott and Costello Meet Dr. Jekyll and Mr. Hyde (1953) - Drunk in Pub (uncredited)
Donovan's Reef (1963) - Australian Officer (uncredited) (final film role)

References

External links

 
 

1891 births
1984 deaths
Australian male television actors
Australian male silent film actors
Silent film comedians
20th-century Australian male actors
Australian expatriate male actors in the United States